The 2022–23 SFA South Region Challenge Cup is the 16th edition of the annual knockout cup competition for senior non-league clubs in the central and southern regions of Scotland. The tournament entry increased from 161 to a record 163 teams thanks to additional clubs joining the West of Scotland Football League. 

The competition is named the Traderadiators.com South Challenge Cup for sponsorship reasons.

The defending champions are Auchinleck Talbot of the West of Scotland League, who beat Lowland League champions Bonnyrigg Rose Athletic 3–1 in the final on 22 May 2022.

Format
The South Challenge Cup features 163 senior non-league clubs from the Lowland Football League (16), East of Scotland Football League (59), South of Scotland Football League (10), and West of Scotland Football League (79). The reserve teams of Stirling University, Caledonian Braves, and Stranraer, as well as Celtic B, Heart of Midlothian B, and Rangers B, do not take part. Newburgh were debarred due to a breach of rules.

The first and second rounds were regionalised, with north-east, south-east, south-west, and north-west sections each containing 40 or 41 clubs.

The draws are unseeded, with matches proceeding to extra time and penalties if they were tied after 90 minutes.

Calendar

First round
The draw for the regionalised first and second rounds took place on Sunday 26 June 2022. Each zone features 9 fixtures in the first round with 23 clubs receiving a bye to the second round (except the South-West zone featuring 8 matches and 24 byes).

North-East zone

South-East zone

South-West zone

North-West zone

Second round

North-East zone

South-East zone

South-West zone

North-West zone

Third round
The majority of the third round ties took place on the weekend of 19 November 2022, reverting to an open draw with 32 fixtures being played.

Fourth round

Draw

Matches

Fifth round

Draw
The draw for the fifth round was made on 6 February 2023, live on the West of Scotland Football League YouTube channel.

Teams in Italics were unknown at the time of the draw.

Matches

Quarter-finals

Draw

Matches

Semi-finals

Matches

References

South
South Challenge Cup seasons